Florence Thomassin (born 24 June 1966) is a French actress and sculptor. In 2001, Thomassin was nominated for a César Award for Best Supporting Actress for her role of Beatrice in Bernard Rapp's A Question of Taste ("Une affaire de goût").

Filmography

References

External links

1966 births
French film actresses
French stage actresses
French television actresses
Living people
Actresses from Paris
20th-century French actresses
21st-century French actresses